GCBC is an abbreviation that may refer to:
 Girton College Boat Club, the rowing club of Girton College, Cambridge University, England
 Good Cop/Bad Cop, a character in The LEGO Movie
 Grace College of Business and Computer Science, a private college located in Addis Ababa, Ethiopia 
 Grey College Boat Club, the rowing club of Grey College, Durham, Durham University, England